| tries = 96
| top point scorer =  Samuel Marques (74 points)
| top try scorer =  Raffaele Storti (7 tries)
| website = 
| previous year = 2020
| previous tournament = 2020 Rugby Europe Championship
| next year = 2022
| next tournament = 2022 Rugby Europe Championship
}}

The 2021 Rugby Europe Championship was the 5th Rugby Europe Championship, the annual rugby union competition contested by the national teams of Georgia, Portugal, Romania, Russia, Spain and the Netherlands (who promoted to the Championship after defeating Belgium in the promotion/relegation play-off of the 2020 Rugby Europe Championship), and the 52nd edition of the competition (including all its previous incarnations as FIRA Tournament, Rugby Union European Cup, FIRA Nations Cup, FIRA Trophy and European Nations Cup). Due to the COVID-19 pandemic, the tournament spanned from March to December, compared to previous editions where the tournament would have been held between February and March.

This year's edition of the Rugby Europe Championship doubles as the first year of the 2023 Rugby World Cup qualifiers for the European region, where the winner and runner-up of the two-year cycle automatically qualify to the tournament as Europe 1 and Europe 2 respectively while the team in third place advances to the final qualification tournament as Europe 3.

Squads

Participants

Table

Fixtures

Week 1

Touch judges:
Eugeniu Procopi (Moldova)
Saba Abulashvili (Georgia)
Television match official:
 Tornike Gvirjishvili (Georgia)

Touch judges:
Federico Vedovelli (Italy)
Filippo Bertelli (Italy)
Television match official:
Stefano Roscini (Italy)

Week 2

Touch judges:
Pierre-Baptiste Nuchy (France)
Richard Duhau (France)
Television match official:
Patrick Dellac (France)

Touch judges:
Sébastien Minery (France)
Jean-Claude Labarbe (France)
Television match official:
Philippe Bonhoure (France)

Week 3

Touch judges:
Manuel Bottino (Italy)
Matteo Franco (Italy)
Television match official:
Matteo Liperini (Italy)

Touch judges:
Papuna Chiqaberidze (Georgia)
Giga Mshvenieradze (Georgia)
Television match official:
Sulkhan Chikhladze (Georgia)

Week 4

Touch judges:
Cedric Marchat (France)
Stéphane Crapoix (France)
Television match official:
Denis Grenouillet (France)

Touch judges:
Francisco Serra (Portugal)
José Moita (Portugal)
Television match official:
 Pedro Mendes Silva (Portugal)

Week 5

Touch judges:
 Mihai Văcaru (Romania)
 Vlad Iordăchescu (Romania)
Television match official:
 Cristian Răduță (Romania)

Week 6

Touch judges:
 Gareth Newman (Wales)
 Dewi Phillips (Wales)
Television match official:
 Sean Brickell (Wales)

Week 7

Touch judges:
 Alexandru Ionescu (Romania)
  Radu Petrescu (Romania)

Television match official:
  Charles Samson (Scotland)

Week 8

Touch judges:
 David Sutherland (Scotland)
  Graeme Ormiston (Scotland)

Television match official:
  Neil Paterson  (Scotland)

Week 9

Touch judges:
 Nigel Correll (Ireland)
 Stuart Douglas (Ireland)

Television match official:
  Leo Colgan (Ireland)

Touch judges:
 Jason Bessant (Wales)
 Tom Spurrier (Wales)

Television match official:
 Wayne Davies (Wales)

Week 10

Touch judges:
 Andrew Cole (Ireland)
 Jonny Erskine (Ireland)

Television match official:
  Colin Stanley  (Ireland)

International broadcasters

See also
 Rugby Europe International Championships
 Antim Cup
 Kiseleff Cup
 Six Nations Championship

References

2020–21 Rugby Europe International Championships
Rugby Europe Championship
Rugby Europe
Rugby Europe
2021 in Georgian sport